Makhdoom Alauddin Ali Ahmed Sabir, also known as صابر کلیری Sabir Kaliyari ("Sabir of Kaliyar"), was an Indian Sunni Muslim preacher and Sufi saint in the 13th century. He was nephew successor to Baba Fareed (1188–1280), and the first in the Sabiriya branch of the Chishti Order. Today, his dargah (Sufi mausoleum) is in Kaliyar town, near Haridwar in Uttarakhand state, India. The dargah is one of the most revered shrines for Muslims in India, after Ajmer Sharif at Ajmer.

Biography
Alauddin Sabir Kaliyari was the great grandson of Abdul Qadir Gilani. His father was Sayyid Abdus Salaam Abdur Rahim Jilani, son of Abdul Wahaab Jilani, eldest son of Abdul Qadir Jilani. His mother was Jamilah, elder sister of  Fariduddin Ganjshakar and direct descendant of Umar Al Faruq.
Alauddin Sabir Kaliyari was born in Kohtwaal, a town in the district of Multan in 13 Rabi' al-awwal, 592 Hijri (1196). After the death of his father, Abul Rahim, his mother brought him to Pakpattan in 1204 to Baba Fareed.

Baba Fareed entrusted him with the duty of distribution of food (Langar). He accepted this duty happily and in between engaged himself in prayers. He dispensed with his duties well and also attended the discourse of Baba Freed Ganj-e-Shakar. Frequent and continuous fasting and eating leaves and wild food made him weak. When his mother came back again and saw him, she complained to his brother (Baba Fareed) about his weakness. Baba Fareed called upon him and asked the reason. Sabir Pak replied, “You ordered me to distribute the food and not to partake from it”. Baba Fareed embraced him happily and remarked, “He is sabir (Patient)”. From that day forth, He became famous with the name of “Sabir”.

Dargah
His resting place Dargah is in Peeran-e-Kaliyar, 7 km from Roorkee, in Haridwar district, besides Ganga canal, and is approachable by a metalled road. The tomb was built by Ibrahim Lodhi, a ruler of Delhi.
A 15-day 'Urs' celebrations are held each year at the shrine, in the Rabi' al-awwal month of the Hijri and the Dargah has become a symbol of national integration as people regardless of their religion, caste and creed throng it, in large numbers.

See also
Chishti Order
Nizamuddin Auliya
Piran Kaliyar Sharif

References

 Book: Tadhkira Anwar-i-Sabiri – An account of Sabir's Enlightenment] by Dar-ul-Ehsan Publications and Sabir'ul Baqa Networks
Mashaikh-e-Chist, by Maulana Muhammad Zakariyya, Translated by Mujlisul Ulama of South Africa, 1998
 Islam in India, by Vidyajyoti Institute of Religious Studies Islamic Section. Vikas Pub. House, 1985. . page 61.
 Encyclopaedia of Sufism, Ed. Masood Ali Khan & S. Ram. New Delhi, Anmol, 2003, Vol 1–12. . (Vol 5.)
Rose, H.A., Ibbetson, D., Maclagan, E.D.A glossary of the tribes and castes of the Punjab and North-West Frontier Province. Vol. 3, L.-Z with Appendices A.-L, Asian Educational Services, 1990. 

Indian Sufi saints
Chishtis
People from Saharanpur
Haridwar
1196 births
1291 deaths
Punjabi Sufis
People from Multan
People from Haridwar district
Chishti-Sabiris